Roderick White (June 23, 1814 in Springville, then in Niagara Co., now in Erie County, New York – May 26, 1856 in Olean, Cattaraugus County, New York) was an American lawyer and politician from New York.

Life
He was the son of Francis White (1782–1858) and Emma/Amy (Rushmore) White (b. 1787). He married Sarah Nichols (1822–1883), and they had six children.

He was a Whig member of the New York State Assembly (Cattaraugus Co.) in 1845.

He was a Republican member of the New York State Senate (32nd D.) in 1856 and died shortly after the end of the session.

He was buried at the Mount View Cemetery in Olean.

Sources
The New York Civil List compiled by Franklin Benjamin Hough (pages 137, 147, 230 and 316; Weed, Parsons and Co., 1858)
His wife's death notice, transcribed from the Olean Democrat (May 15, 1883), at RootsWeb
White genealogy at Family Tree Maker

External links

1814 births
1856 deaths
Members of the New York State Assembly
New York (state) state senators
People from Olean, New York
New York (state) Republicans
People from Erie County, New York
New York (state) Whigs
19th-century American politicians
People from Springville, New York